The Autograph Rock Historic District, in Cimarron County, Oklahoma near Boise City, Oklahoma, is a  historic district that was listed on the National Register of Historic Places in 1994.  It is associated with NPS Master Plan #123.  It includes five contributing sites.

It includes four "rutted traces" of the Cimarron Cutoff of the Santa Fe Trail, and a sandstone outcropping known as Autograph Rock.  The rock has travelers' names from the 1850-1865 era.

See also 

Inscription Rock (Cimarron County, Oklahoma), also in an NRHP-listed historic district in Cimarron County, also involving travelers' name-carvings

References

External links

Historic districts on the National Register of Historic Places in Oklahoma
Cimarron County, Oklahoma
National Register of Historic Places in Cimarron County, Oklahoma
Santa Fe Trail